The Wood County Courthouse is a public building in downtown Parkersburg, West Virginia, in the United States. The courthouse was built in 1899 at a cost of $100,000 in the Richardsonian Romanesque style by local contractors Caldwell & Drake, according to the plans of architect L. W. Thomas of Canton, Ohio. The current courthouse is the fifth to be built in the county replacing one built in 1860. It was added to the National Register of Historic Places in 1979 for its architectural significance. During his 1912 presidential campaign Theodore Roosevelt stopped in Parkersburg and spoke from the Market street entrance of the courthouse. On 2 July 2020 a new steeple was added to the bell tower replacing one that had been removed in 1952. With the new steeple the courthouse is now the tallest in the state at 164 ft.

See also
National Register of Historic Places listings in Wood County, West Virginia

References

External links

Courthouses on the National Register of Historic Places in West Virginia
Government buildings completed in 1899
County courthouses in West Virginia
Buildings and structures in Parkersburg, West Virginia
Romanesque Revival architecture in West Virginia
Historic American Buildings Survey in West Virginia
National Register of Historic Places in Wood County, West Virginia
1899 establishments in West Virginia